The 1988 NCAA men's volleyball tournament was the 19th annual tournament to determine the national champion of NCAA men's collegiate volleyball. The tournament was played at the Allen County War Memorial Coliseum in Fort Wayne, Indiana during May 1988.

USC defeated UC Santa Barbara in the final match, 3–2 (15–17, 14–16, 15–10, 15–11, 15–9), to win their third national title. The Trojans (34–4) were coached by Bob Yoder.

USC's Jen-Kai Liu was named the tournament's Most Outstanding Player. Liu, along with five other players, also comprised the All-tournament team.

Qualification
Until the creation of the NCAA Men's Division III Volleyball Championship in 2012, there was only a single national championship for men's volleyball. As such, all NCAA men's volleyball programs, whether from Division I, Division II, or Division III, were eligible. A total of 4 teams were invited to contest this championship.

Tournament bracket 
Site: Allen County War Memorial Coliseum, Fort Wayne, Indiana

All tournament team 
Jen-Kai Liu, USC (Most outstanding player)
Tom Duke, USC
Bryan Ivie, USC
Mike Lauterman, USC
David Rottman, UC Santa Barbara
John Wallace, UC Santa Barbara

See also 
 NCAA Men's National Collegiate Volleyball Championship
 NCAA Division I Women's Volleyball Championship

References

NCAA Men's Volleyball Tournament
NCAA Men's Volleyball Championship
NCAA Men's Volleyball Championship
Ncaa Mens Volleyball Tournament
Volleyball in Indiana